Incorporated on June 27, 1897, the Bruton and Pineora Railway (B&P) was controlled by the Central of Georgia Railway and took over the former Atlantic Short Line Railway which had gone bankrupt.  The B&P ran from Brewton (spelling changed from Bruton in 1895) to Register, Georgia, by 1900.  The Central of Georgia fully purchased the B&P in 1901.

Defunct Georgia (U.S. state) railroads
Predecessors of the Central of Georgia Railway
Railway companies established in 1897
Railway companies disestablished in 1901